Disease management may refer to:
Disease management (agriculture)
Disease management (health)